Thompson Water Aerodrome  is located adjacent to Thompson, Manitoba, Canada.

See also
Thompson Airport

References

Registered aerodromes in Manitoba
Thompson, Manitoba
Seaplane bases in Manitoba